Elizabeth Lake is a lake, in the area of Tuolumne Meadows, in Yosemite National Park, California. It was named for a geologist's niece, one Elizabeth Crow Simmons.  The lake is at the base of Unicorn Peak, and is also near Johnson Peak.

The lake is in Tuolumne County, California.

The hike

One gains perhaps . As with all sights in Tuolumne, hiking the trail depends on season, usually May until October.

For the hike, bug spray and sun tan lotion should be used.

See also

General links

 List of lakes in California

Tuolumne Meadows links

 Budd Lake (California), fairly near Budd Lake
 Cathedral Peak, a mountain fairly near Budd Lake
 Cockscomb, another mountain fairly near Budd Lake
 Echo Peaks, mountains near Budd Lake
 Matthes Crest, a mountain which is near Budd Lake
 Unicorn Peak, a peak near Elizabeth Lake

References

External links and references

 On the Elizabeth Lake Trail
 Elizabeth Lake Trail, Yosemite National Park
 Yosemite National Park: Elizabeth Lake
 On a variety of Tuolumne hikes, including but not just Elizabeth Lake
 More on the lake
 A YouTube on the hike
 Another YouTube on the hike

Lakes of Mariposa County, California
Lakes of Yosemite National Park
Tourist attractions in Mariposa County, California